August Johannes Hanko (18 January 1879 Suure-Kambja Parish, Tartu County – 25 May 1952 Kemerovo Oblast) was an Estonian politician, journalist, and writer.

1919–1920, he was Minister of War.

References

1879 births
1952 deaths
Government ministers of Estonia